(兜, 冑) is a type of helmet first used by ancient Japanese warriors which, in later periods, became an important part of the traditional Japanese armour worn by the samurai class and their retainers in feudal Japan.

Note that in the Japanese language, the word  is an appellative, not a type description, and can refer to any combat helmet.

Every year on Children's Day, May 5, Japanese households display miniature kabuto and samurai armor in keeping with the tradition of Tango no Sekku. In feudal times, real samurai armor, kabuto, and tachi were displayed.

History
Japanese helmets dating from the fifth century have been found in excavated tombs. Called  (visor-attached helmet), the style of these kabuto came from China and Korea and they had a pronounced central ridge.

, which is now known as a samurai helmet, first appeared in the 10th century Heian period with the appearance of ō-yoroi. Until the early Muromachi period,  were made by combining dozens of thin iron plates. Generally, only daimyo and samurai at the rank of commander wore  ornaments called , which were shaped like a pair of hoes. In the middle of the Muromachi period, as the number of large-scale group battles increased, ordinary samurai wore  in the shape of hoe, sun, moon or flag on their  to show their courage or to distinguish friend from foe.

In the Sengoku period in the 16th century, when the war became extremely large-scale and the guns called  became popular, the armor styles called  and  became outdated and the armor style called  was born.  are made by combining three to four pieces of iron plates, and they are more bulletproof than the conventional style, enabling mass production, and the  became more eccentric and huge. Some of these  were made of iron, but for safety reasons on the battlefield, they were sometimes made by putting paper on a wooden mold, coating it with lacquer and curing it, and extracting the mold. In the Azuchi–Momoyama period,  had a simple yet more unique and bold design in accordance with the popularity of Momoyama culture.

The kabuto was an important part of the equipment of the samurai, and played a symbolic role as well, which may explain the Japanese expressions, sayings and codes related to them. "Tighten the string of the kabuto after winning the war"). This means don't lower your efforts after succeeding (compare to "not to rest on one's laurels"). Also,  (lit. "to take off the kabuto") means to surrender.

Parts of the kabuto

The basic parts of the kabuto include:
, a dome composed of overlapping elongated plates called 
, a brim or visor on the front of the 
, a cloth lining inside the 
, mounting points for attaching crests
, wing-like or ear-like projections to the sides of the 
, a suspended neck guard composed of multiple overlapping lames

A typical  features a central dome constructed of anywhere from three to over a hundred metal plates riveted together. These were usually arranged vertically, radiating from a small opening in the top. The rivets securing these metal plates to each other could be raised (a form known as ) or hammered flat (a form known as ); another form, called , had the rivets filed flush. Some of the finer  were signed by their makers, usually from one of several known families, such as the Myochin, Saotome, Haruta, Unkai, or Nagasone families.

Although this practice was largely abandoned after the Muromachi period, this opening may have been retained for purposes of ventilation or simply as an artifact of how the plates were riveted together.

These can be family crests (mon), or flat or sculptural objects representing animals, mythical entities, prayers or other symbols. Horns are particularly common, and many kabuto incorporate , stylized antlers.

Types of kabuto

Suji bachi kabuto

Hoshi-bachi kabuto
 (star helmet bowl) with protruding rivet heads, have large rivets, small rivets and a rivet with a chrysantemoid-shaped washer at its base.  could also be  if there were raised ribs or ridges showing where the helmet plates came together.

Hari bachi kabuto
 is multiple-plate Japanese  with no ribs or ridges showing where the helmet plates come and the rivets are filed flush.

Zunari kabuto

The  is a simple, five-plate design.

Tatami kabuto
A great number of simpler, lightweight, folding, portable armours for lower-ranking samurai and foot soldiers were also produced. These were called  armour, and some featured collapsible  (also called ), made from articulated lames.  did not use rivets in their construction; instead, lacing or chain mail was used to connect the pieces to each other.

Kaji kabuto
 were a type of helmet worn by samurai firemen.

Jingasa

Kawari kabuto, or strange helmet
During the Momoyama period of intense civil warfare, kabuto were made to a simpler design of three or four plates, lacking many of the ornamental features of earlier helmets. These shapes mimicked forms from Japanese culture and mythology, including fish, cow horns, the head of the god of longevity, bolts of silk, head scarves, Ichi-no-Tani canyon, and axe heads, among many others. Some forms were realistically rendered, while others took on a very futuristic, modernist feel.

References

External links

Samurai armour
Combat helmets of Japan
Medieval helmets